= Temporary Cyber Operations Act =

Proposed Dutch legislation

The Temporary Cyber Operations Act (Dutch: Tijdelijke wet cyberoperatie) is proposed Dutch legislation that will relax the restrictions on data interception and surveillance in the Intelligence and Security Services Act. It is intended to be used to defend against cyberattacks by other countries.

It was adopted by the Dutch House of Representatives in October 2023. The law was accepted by the Dutch Senate in March 2024.
